The Women's Triple jump at the 2011 All-Africa Games took place on 19 and 22 August at the Estádio Nacional do Zimpeto.

Medalists

Records 
Prior to this competition, the existing World, African record and World leading were as follows:

No new world or Olympic records were set for this event.

Results

Cancelled results
The competition held initially on September 11, but appeal jury of CAA decided to cancel the results and reorganise the event on September 15, due to confusion after Otonye Iworima had a jump wrongly measured at 14.47.

Retake results
On September 15, the tournament held on again, but once again, the Nigerian athlete Otonye Iworim was false marked by the jury before contestation by the Algerian and Malian delegation, and the result of Otonye Iworim was corrected to 13.48m.

References

Triple jump Women
2011 in women's athletics
2011